Girl Online: On Tour is the second novel by English author and YouTuber Zoe Sugg, released on 20 October 2015 through Penguin Books. The book is the second in the Girl Online series and is set six months after the original novel, Girl Online. The romance and drama novel is aimed at a young adult audience and focuses on a teenage girl, Penny, and the events as she joins her musician boyfriend on tour.

Plot
The novel takes place six months after the first book and surrounds Penny Porter, an ex-blogger who is dating up-and-coming rock star Noah Flynn as he goes on a world tour supporting a new boy band. Penny joins him for the European leg of the tour and finds touring isn't quite as glamorous as she imagined.

Publication history
Girl Online was released on 20 October 2015 through Penguin Books and the audiobook was released on 20 November 2015 through Audible.com. Before its release the novel was expected to be a success; tickets to the book-signing tour sold out in five minutes.

Publication
 Hardback, 20 Oct 2015
 UK: Penguin Books 
 USA: Atria 
 Audiobook, 20 Nov 2015, Audible
 Paperback, 14 July 2016
 UK: Penguin Books 
 USA: Atria

Reception
The novel was relatively well received, with most reviewers comparing the novel favourably to her debut. In a review for The Daily Telegraph, Charlotte Runcie found Girl Online: On Tour to be more mature than the previous, finding that "elements of Sugg’s own experiences... shine through with greater authenticity here" and that while the plot is "painted in broad strokes", "the bubblegum schmaltz gives way to some enjoyable coming-of-age drama", rating the novel a three out of five. David Barnett, writing for The Independent, found that while the novel deals with complex themes its treatment of them is somewhat lighthearted, stating: "it pitches to be Judy Blume and comes off more like Enid Blyton".

Sequel
Girl Online: Going Solo, the third novel in the series, was published in hardback on 17 November 2016.

References

2015 British novels
Novels by Zoe Sugg
Penguin Books books
British young adult novels
Novels about the Internet
Books by YouTubers